Alfred Trevillian (22 April 1877 – 2 December 1954) was an Australian rules footballer who played for the St Kilda Football Club in the Victorian Football League (VFL).

Statistics
Trevillian debuted at 25 years and 11 days and played until he was 29 years and 139 days. He was the 732nd player to appear, 4318th for most games played, and 4462nd for most goals kicked.

References

External links 

1877 births
1954 deaths
Australian rules footballers from Victoria (Australia)
St Kilda Football Club players
Rutherglen Football Club players